Don Dare Devil is a 1925 American silent Western film directed by Clifford Smith and written by Wyndham Gittens. The film stars Jack Hoxie, Cathleen Calhoun, Duke R. Lee, William Welsh, Thomas G. Lingham, and Evelyn Sherman. The film was released on July 18, 1925, by Universal Pictures.

Plot
As described in a film magazine review, Jack Bannister goes to South America to take over property left by his Spanish mother. Benito Menocal, a former pal, is killed by Bud Latham, an American bad man. Jack goes after him and finds Latham trailing Ynez and her father José Remado. Jack sides with them, eventually running Latham into the ground, saving the young woman and her father, which ends romantically.

Cast

References

External links
 
 

1925 films
1925 Western (genre) films
Universal Pictures films
Films directed by Clifford Smith
American black-and-white films
Silent American Western (genre) films
1920s English-language films
1920s American films